Bodoquena is a municipality located in the Brazilian state of Mato Grosso do Sul. Its population was 7,838 (2020) and its area is 2,507 km².

References

Municipalities in Mato Grosso do Sul